Mono Inc. is a German gothic rock band from Hamburg, founded in 2000.

MONO is a derivative of Monomania (German "Monomanie"), a term from the 19th century psychiatric disease theory, a form of partial insanity conceived as single pathological preoccupation in an otherwise sound mind. "Monomania Incorporated" means "Company of the partially insane" which was shortened to MONO INC. for the band's name.

History 

Mono Inc. was formed in 2000 by Miky Mono (lead vocals, bass), Carl Fornia (guitar), Chad Hauger(Cowbell) and Martin Engler (drums). Bass player Manuel Antoni joined in 2003, coinciding with the release of their self-published debut album Head Under Water. In 2004, the band signed with NoCut Entertainment  and re-released the album with new artwork, spawning two singles: "Burn Me" and "Superman".  During the production of their second album Temple Of The Torn in 2006, Miky Mono was replaced with Engler on vocals and Katha Mia on drums. The album was released in 2007. The band's third album, Pain, Love & Poetry, was released in 2008. The album contains three new versions of songs from  Head Under Water and a duet with Lisa Middelhauve of Xandria in the single "Teach Me to Love".  In 2009, Mono Inc. released their fourth album, Voices Of Doom.

The band toured in 2009 with Subway to Sally and ASP, playing at more than forty concerts in Germany, Austria, and Switzerland, and began headlining in 2010 during their "Voices Of Doom Tour".  Former singer Miky Mono died in October 2010 in a paragliding accident.  On 18 March 2011, Mono Inc. released their fifth album, Viva Hades. This was followed by another headlining tour, the "Viva Hades Tour", which included appearances in Austria and Switzerland for the second time, and guest appearances at the M'era Luna Festival and other festivals.  After changing labels to  SPV / Rookies & Kings in August 2012, the band released their sixth album, After The War, beginning the "After the War Tour". The song From the Ashes was performed live at the cruiserweight boxing match on 15 September 2012 between Yoan Pablo Hernández and Troy Ross in the Brose Arena in Bamberg.

Their seventh album, Nimmermehr, was released on 9 August 2013, reaching third place in the German Offizielle Top 100 charts in its first week.  In August 2014, the band released their first compilation album, the two-disc The Clock Ticks On 2004-2014. The first disc, titled "The Clock Ticks On", is a sixteen-track "best of" compilation. The second disc, titled "Alive & Acoustic", is a sixteen-track acoustic re-release. "Gothic Queen" and "Twice In Life" served as the album's two singles, the second being the only new song composed for the album. The album was supported by the "Clock Ticks On Tour" in 2014 and the "Alive & Acoustic Tour" in 2015.  In May 2015, the band released their eighth album, Terlingua, spawning five singles, followed by their "Terlingua Tour". In January 2017, they released their ninth album Together Till The End and later that year released their second compilation album, titled Symphonies of Pain. It is more comprehensive than The Clock Ticks On. In July 2018, they released their tenth album Welcome to Hell, followed by The Book of Fire in January 2020. The book of fire reached number one on the music charts. To celebrate the success, a different version of The Book of Fire was released in 2021 called The Book of Fire (Platinum edition). The album was followed by a massive international tour.

Members

Current 

 Martin Engler – lead vocals (2007–present), drummer (2000-2007)
 Carl Fornia – guitar player and backing vocals (2000–present)
 Katha Mia – drummer and backing vocals (2007–present)
 Val Perun – bass player and backing vocals (2022-present)

Past 
 Miky Mono – lead vocals (2000-2007) and bass player (2000-2003)
 Manuel Antoni – bass player and backing vocals (2003–2021)

Timeline

Discography

Studio albums

Compilation albums

Live albums

Singles 
 "Burn Me"
 "Superman"
 "Temple Of The Torn"
 "In My Heart"
 "Somberland"
 "This Is The Day"
 "Teach Me To Love"
 "Sleeping My Day Away"
 "Get Some Sleep"
 "Voices Of Doom"
 "Comedown"
 "Symphony Of Pain"
 "Revenge"
 "The Best Of You"
 "After The War"
 "Wave No Flag"
 "Arabia"
 "Heile, Heile Segen"
 "My Deal With God"
 "Kein Weg Zu Weit"
 "Gothic Queen"
 "Twice In Life"
 "Never-Ending Love Song"
 "Heiland"
 "Tag X"
 "An Klaren Tagen"
 "Chasing Cars"
 "Children Of The Dark"
 "The Bank Of Eden"
 "Welcome To Hell"
 "A Vagabond's Life"
 "The Raven's Back"
 "Princess of the Night"
 "Empire"
 "Heartbeat of the Dead"

EPs 
2010: Comedown
2011: Revenge
2012: After The War
2013: Fan EP
2013: MMXII
2013: Twice In Life: An Acoustic EP
2015: Radio Mono Bonus EP
2015: Heiland
2015: An Klaren Tagen

Music videos 
2004: Superman
2007: Temple of the Torn
2007: In My Heart
2008: Teach Me to Love
2008: Sleep My Day Away
2008: Get Some Sleep
2008: This is the Day
2009: Voices of Doom
2011: Symphony of Pain
2011: Best of You
2012: Comedown
2012: After the War
2012: Arabia
2013: My Deal With God
2013: Kein Weg zu Weit (ft. Joachim Witt)
2014: Twice in Life
2016: Children Of The Dark
2017: Together Till The End
2018: Welcome to Hell
2018: A Vagabond's Life (ft. Eric Fish)
2018: Long Live Death
2019: The Book of Fire
2019: Louder than Hell
2019: Warriors

References

External links 

 
 

Dark rock groups
German alternative rock groups
German gothic rock groups
German gothic metal musical groups
German industrial metal musical groups
Musical groups from Hamburg